The 2021–22 Memphis Grizzlies season was the 27th season of the franchise in the National Basketball Association (NBA) and 21st in Memphis.

On December 2, 2021, the Grizzlies defeated the Oklahoma City Thunder by an NBA record–setting 73 points, with a final score of 152–79; at one point they led by 78 points (148–70) in the final minutes of the game, but the 73-point margin is still the largest margin of victory in NBA history. The previous record was a Cleveland Cavaliers 68–point blowout win over the Miami Heat, 148–80, on December 17, 1991 that game had held the record for nearly three decades. The Grizzlies also set several other franchise records that same night, with points in one single game (152 points) and bench points scored (93 points).

The Grizzlies qualified for the playoffs for the second consecutive season after a 133–103 win over the Indiana Pacers on March 25, 2022. They also won the Southwest division title for the first time in Grizzlies' franchise history after a 112–111 win over the San Antonio Spurs on March 30, 2022. They are also the second non–Texas based franchise to win the Southwest Division title since the 2007–08 New Orleans Hornets. The Grizzlies defeated the Minnesota Timberwolves in six games the first round, winning their first playoff series since 2015. In the second round, they faced the Golden State Warriors, where they lost in six games.

Draft

The Grizzlies carry one first-round pick and one second-round pick currently.  The 51st pick was given to the Grizzlies from the Mavericks in regards to a Delon Wright trade from the 2019-20 season.

Roster

Standings

Division

Conference

Game log

Preseason

|-style="background:#cfc;"
| 1
| October 5
| Milwaukee
| 
| Ja Morant (27)
| Steven Adams (10)
| Ja Morant (4)
| FedExForumN/A
| 1–0
|-style="background:#cfc;"
| 2
| October 7
| @ Charlotte
| 
| Desmond Bane (19)
| Steven Adams (16)
| Ja Morant (8)
| Spectrum Center8,916
| 2–0
|-style="background:#fcc;"
| 3
| October 9
| @ Atlanta
| 
| Desmond Bane (18)
| Xavier Tillman (11)
| Xavier Tillman (4)
| FedExForum11,027
| 2–1
|-style="background:#cfc;"
| 4
| October 11
| Detroit
| 
| Ja Morant (24)
| Steven Adams (9)
| Ja Morant (5)
| FedExForum10,286
| 3–1
|-style="background:#fcc;"
| 5
| October 13
| @ Indiana
| 
| Sam Merrill (30)
| Santi Aldama (11)
| John Konchar (6)
| Gainbridge Fieldhouse5,997
| 3–2
|-style="background:#fcc;"
| 6
| October 15
| @ Chicago
| 
| Jaren Jackson Jr. (29)
| Steven Adams (9)
| Desmond Bane (5)
| United Center14,412
| 3–3

Regular season

|-style="background:#cfc;"
| 1
| October 20
| Cleveland
| 
| Ja Morant (37)
| Steven Adams (14)
| Ja Morant (6)
| FedExForum15,975
| 1–0
|-style="background:#cfc;"
| 2
| October 23
| @ L.A. Clippers
| 
| Ja Morant (28)
| Steven Adams (9)
| Ja Morant (8)
| Staples Center16,748
| 2–0
|-style="background:#fcc;"
| 3
| October 24
| @ L.A. Lakers
| 
| Ja Morant (40)
| Steven Adams (16)
| Ja Morant (10)
| Staples Center18,997
| 2–1
|-style="background:#fcc;"
| 4
| October 27
| @ Portland
|  
| Desmond Bane (19)
| Ja Morant (9)
| Ja Morant (10)
| Moda Center16,241
| 2–2
|-style="background:#cfc;"
| 5
| October 28
| @ Golden State
|  
| Ja Morant (30)
| Kyle Anderson (9)
| Ja Morant (5)
| Chase Center18,064
| 3–2
|-style="background:#fcc;"
| 6
| October 30
| Miami
| 
| Melton, Morant (20)
| Adams, Tillman Sr. (5)
| Ja Morant (7)
| FedExForum15,989
| 3–3

|-style="background:#cfc;"
| 7
| November 1
| Denver
| 
| Ja Morant (26)
| Kyle Anderson (9)
| Ja Morant (8)
| FedExForum12,683
| 4–3
|-style="background:#cfc;"
| 8
| November 3
| Denver
| 
| Jaren Jackson Jr. (22)
| Adams, Jackson Jr. (8)
| Tyus Jones (7)
| FedExForum12,977
| 5–3
|-style="background:#fcc;"
| 9
| November 5
| @ Washington
| 
| Jaren Jackson Jr. (13)
| Jaren Jackson Jr. (9)
| Anderson, Morant (4)
| Capital One Arena16,302
| 5–4
|-style="background:#cfc;"
| 10
| November 7
| Minnesota
| 
| Ja Morant (33)
| Anderson, Clarke (9)
| Ja Morant (8)
| FedExForum12,416
| 6–4
|-style="background:#fcc;"
| 11
| November 10
| Charlotte
| 
| Ja Morant (32)
| Steven Adams (13)
| Ja Morant (8)
| FedExForum13,880
| 6–5
|-style="background:#fcc;"
| 12
| November 12
| Phoenix
| 
| Ja Morant (26)
| Ja Morant (12)
| Ja Morant (6)
| FedExForum15,886
| 6–6
|-style="background:#fcc;"
| 13
| November 13
| @ New Orleans
| 
| Dillon Brooks (23)
| Adams, Morant (9)
| Ja Morant (10)
| Smoothie King Center14,358
| 6–7
|-style="background:#cfc;"
| 14
| November 15
| Houston
| 
| Ja Morant (22)
| Jaren Jackson Jr. (7)
| Ja Morant (6)
| FedExForum11,482
| 7–7
|-style="background:#cfc;"
| 15
| November 18
| L.A. Clippers
| 
| Ja Morant (28)
| Steven Adams (10)
| Adams, Morant (5)
| FedExForum13,419
| 8–7
|-style="background:#fcc;"
| 16
| November 20
| @ Minnesota
| 
| Desmond Bane (21)
| John Konchar (7)
| Ja Morant (5)
| Target Center17,136
| 8–8
|-style="background:#cfc;"
| 17
| November 22
| @ Utah
| 
| Ja Morant (32)
| Brandon Clarke (9)
| Ja Morant (7)
| Vivint Arena18,306
| 9–8
|-style="background:#fcc;"
| 18
| November 24
| Toronto
| 
| Ja Morant (23)
| Brandon Clarke (8)
| Ja Morant (9)
| FedExForum15,409
| 9–9
|-style="background:#fcc;"
| 19
| November 26
| Atlanta
| 
| John Konchar (17)
| Brooks, Clarke, Jackson Jr., Konchar (5)
| Brandon Clarke (4)
| FedExForum16,622
| 9–10
|-style="background:#cfc;"
| 20
| November 28
| Sacramento
| 
| Dillon Brooks (21)
| Steven Adams (12)
| Tyus Jones (8)
| FedExForum12,844
| 10–10
|-style="background:#cfc;"
| 21
| November 30
| @ Toronto
| 
| Jaren Jackson Jr. (25)
| De'Anthony Melton (10)
| Tyus Jones (6) 
| Scotiabank Arena19,800
| 11–10

|-style="background:#cfc;"
| 22
| December 2
| Oklahoma City
| 
| Jaren Jackson Jr. (27)
| Santi Aldama (10)
| Tyus Jones (9)
| FedExForum13,103
| 12–10
|-style="background:#cfc;"
| 23
| December 4
| @ Dallas
| 
| Desmond Bane (29)
| Steven Adams (13)
| Tyus Jones (7)
| American Airlines Center19,396
| 13–10
|-style="background:#cfc;"
| 24
| December 6
| @ Miami
| 
| Bane, Brooks (21)
| Steven Adams (16) 
| Dillon Brooks (8)
| FTX Arena19,600
| 14–10
|-style="background:#fcc;"
| 25
| December 8
| Dallas
| 
| Jaren Jackson Jr. (26)
| Steven Adams (9)
| Tyus Jones (8)
| FedExForum14,025
| 14–11
|-style="background:#cfc;"
| 26
| December 9
| L.A. Lakers
| 
| Jaren Jackson Jr. (25)
| Steven Adams (13)
| Jones, Melton (6)
| FedExForum16,334
| 15–11
|-style="background:#cfc;"
| 27
| December 11
| Houston
| 
| Dillon Brooks (25)
| Steven Adams (9)
| Tyus Jones (6)
| FedExForum17,794
| 16–11
|-style="background:#cfc;"
| 28
| December 13
| Philadelphia
| 
| Dillon Brooks (23)
| Desmond Bane (8)
| Desmond Bane (6)
| FedExForum13,420
| 17–11
|-style="background:#cfc;"
| 29
| December 15
| @ Portland
| 
| Desmond Bane (23)
| Steven Adams (14)
| Dillon Brooks (6)
| Moda Center15,773
| 18–11
|-style="background:#cfc;"
| 30
| December 17
| @ Sacramento
| 
| Desmond Bane (24)
| Steven Adams (12)
| Kyle Anderson (6)
| Golden 1 Center14,659
| 19–11
|-style="background:#fcc;"
| 31
| December 19
| Portland
| 
| Dillon Brooks (37)
| Steven Adams (9)
| Adams, Jones (5)
| FedExForum15,977
| 19–12
|-style="background:#fcc;"
| 32
| December 20
| Oklahoma City
| 
| Dillon Brooks (19)
| Steven Adams (14)
| Ja Morant (8)
| FedExForum15,721
| 19–13
|-style="background:#fcc;"
| 33
| December 23
| @ Golden State
| 
| Ja Morant (21)
| De'Anthony Melton (9)
| Ja Morant (6)
| Chase Center18,064
| 19–14
|-style="background:#cfc;"
| 34
| December 26
| @ Sacramento
| 
| Desmond Bane (28)
| John Konchar (14)
| Ja Morant (9)
| Golden 1 Center15,685
| 20–14
|-style="background:#cfc;"
| 35
| December 27
| @ Phoenix
| 
| Ja Morant (33)
| Steven Adams (16)
| Steven Adams (7)
| Footprint Center17,071
| 21–14
|-style="background:#cfc;"
| 36
| December 29
| L.A. Lakers
| 
| Ja Morant (41)
| Ja Morant (10)
| Tyus Jones (7)
| FedExForum17,794
| 22–14
|-style="background:#cfc;"
| 37
| December 31
| San Antonio
| 
| Ja Morant (30)
| Steven Adams (13)
| Ja Morant (8)
| FedExForum15,412
| 23–14

|-style="background:#cfc;"
| 38
| January 3
| @ Brooklyn
| 
| Ja Morant (36)
| Steven Adams (12)
| Ja Morant (8)
| Barclays Center17,089
| 24–14
|-style="background:#cfc;"
| 39
| January 4
| @ Cleveland
| 
| Ja Morant (26)
| Steven Adams (11)
| Desmond Bane (7)
| Rocket Mortgage FieldHouse18,178
| 25–14
|-style="background:#cfc;"
| 40
| January 6
| Detroit
| 
| Ja Morant (22)
| Steven Adams (14)
| Melton, Morant (6)
| FedEx Forum12,983
| 26–14
|-style="background:#cfc;"
| 41
| January 8
| @ L.A. Clippers
| 
| Jaren Jackson Jr. (26)
| Brandon Clarke (15)
| De'Anthony Melton (6)
| Staples Center17,936
| 27–14
|-style="background:#cfc;"
| 42
| January 9
| @ L.A. Lakers
| 
| Desmond Bane (23)
| Jaren Jackson Jr. (12) 
| Kyle Anderson (8)
| Staples Center18,288
| 28–14
|-style="background:#cfc;"
| 43
| January 11
| Golden State
| 
| Ja Morant (29)
| Jaren Jackson Jr. (11) 
| Ja Morant (8)
| FedEx Forum17,794
| 29–14
|-style="background:#cfc;"
| 44
| January 13
| Minnesota
| 
| Desmond Bane (21)
| John Konchar (17)
| Ja Morant (9)
| FedEx Forum15,881
| 30–14
|-style="background:#fcc;"
| 45
| January 14
| Dallas
| 
| Ja Morant (19)
| Jaren Jackson Jr. (8) 
| Ja Morant (8)
| FedEx Forum16,712
| 30–15
|-style="background:#cfc;"
| 46
| January 17
| Chicago
| 
| Bane, Morant (25)
| Steven Adams (10)
| Tyus Jones (8)
| FedEx Forum17,794
| 31–15
|-style="background:#fcc;"
| 47
| January 19
| @ Milwaukee
| 
| Ja Morant (33)
| Steven Adams (11)
| Ja Morant (14) 
| Fiserv Forum17,341
| 31–16
|-style="background:#cfc;"
| 48
| January 21
| @ Denver
|  
| Ja Morant (38)
| De'Anthony Melton (9)
| Ja Morant (6)
| Ball Arena17,009
| 32–16
|-style="background:#fcc;"
| 49
| January 23
| @ Dallas 
|  
| Ja Morant (35) 
| Ja Morant (13) 
| Ja Morant (6) 
| American Airlines Center19,701
| 32–17
|-style="background:#cfc;"
| 50
| January 26
| @ San Antonio
|  
| Ja Morant (41) 
| Jaren Jackson Jr. (9) 
| Ja Morant (8) 
| AT&T Center14,662
| 33–17
|-style="background:#cfc;"
| 51
| January 28
| Utah
|  
| Ja Morant (30)
| Ja Morant (10)
| Ja Morant (10)
| FedEx Forum16,916
| 34–17
|-style="background:#cfc;"
| 52
| January 29
| Washington
|  
| Ja Morant (34) 
| Steven Adams (15)
| John Konchar (5)
| FedEx Forum17,135
| 35–17
|-style="background:#fcc;"
| 53
| January 31
| @ Philadelphia
|  
| Ja Morant (37) 
| Steven Adams (12)
| Ja Morant (5)
| Wells Fargo Center20,424
| 35–18
|-

|-style="background:#cfc;"
| 54
| February 2
| @ New York
| 
| Jaren Jackson Jr. (26)
| Steven Adams (13)
| Ja Morant (9)
| Madison Square Garden19,812
| 36–18
|-style="background:#cfc;"
| 55
| February 5
| @ Orlando
| 
| Ja Morant (33)
| Steven Adams (11)
| Steven Adams (8)
| Amway Center18,846
| 37–18
|-style="background:#cfc;"
| 56
| February 8
| L.A. Clippers
| 
| Ja Morant (30)
| Jaren Jackson Jr. (11)
| Ja Morant (5)
| FedEx Forum16,101
| 38–18
|-style="background:#cfc;"
| 57
| February 10
| @ Detroit
| 
| Ja Morant (23)
| Steven Adams (14)
| Ja Morant (6) 
| Little Caesars Arena18,744
| 39–18
|-style="background:#cfc;"
| 58
| February 12
| @ Charlotte
| 
| Ja Morant (26)
| Steven Adams (11)
| Anderson, Morant (6)
| Spectrum Center19,454
| 40–18
|-style="background:#cfc;"
| 59
| February 15
| @ New Orleans
| 
| Tyus Jones (27)
| Steven Adams (13)
| Tyus Jones (9) 
| Smoothie King Center15,901
| 41–18
|-style="background:#fcc;"
| 60
| February 16
| Portland
| 
| Ja Morant (44)
| Brandon Clarke (10)
| Ja Morant (11) 
| FedEx Forum16,834
| 41–19
|-style="background:#fcc;"
| 61
| February 24
| @ Minnesota
| 
| Jackson Jr., Williams (21)
| Steven Adams (12)
| De'Anthony Melton (6)
| Target Center16,326
| 41–20
|-style="background:#cfc;"
| 62
| February 26
| @ Chicago
| 
| Ja Morant (46)
| Steven Adams (21)
| Adams, Bane (5)
| United Center21,959
| 42–20
|-style="background:#cfc;"
| 63
| February 28
| San Antonio
| 
| Ja Morant (52) 
| Steven Adams (14)
| Anderson, Bane (6)
| FedEx Forum16,812
| 43–20
|-

|-style="background:#fcc;"
| 64
| March 3
| @ Boston
| 
| Ja Morant (38) 
| Steven Adams (8)
| Ja Morant (7)
| TD Garden19,156
| 43–21
|-style="background:#cfc;"
| 65
| March 5
| Orlando
| 
| Ja Morant (25) 
| John Konchar (11)
| Ja Morant (7)
| FedEx Forum17,794
| 44–21
|-style="background:#fcc;"
| 66
| March 6
| @ Houston
| 
| Desmond Bane (28)
| Steven Adams (12)
| Jones, Morant (6)
| Toyota Center18,055
| 44–22
|-style="background:#cfc;"
| 67
| March 8
| New Orleans
| 
| Ja Morant (24)
| Ja Morant (8) 
| Ja Morant (8)
| FedEx Forum16,433
| 45–22
|-style="background:#cfc;"
| 68
| March 11
| New York
| 
| Ja Morant (37) 
| Adams, Anderson (9)
| Ja Morant (8)
| FedEx Forum17,188
| 46–22
|-style="background:#cfc;"
| 69
| March 13
| @ Oklahoma City
| 
| Desmond Bane (21)
| Steven Adams (16) 
| Ja Morant (10)
| Paycom Center17,482
| 47–22
|-style="background:#cfc;"
| 70
| March 15
| @ Indiana
| 
| Desmond Bane (21) 
| Steven Adams (13)
| Tyus Jones (10)
| Gainbridge Fieldhouse15,027
| 48–22
|-
|-style="background:#fcc;"
| 71
| March 18
| @ Atlanta
| 
| Ja Morant (29)
| Steven Adams (11)
| Ja Morant (4)
| State Farm Arena18,062
| 48–23
|-
|-style="background:#cfc;"
| 72
| March 20
| @ Houston
| 
| Desmond Bane (24)
| Steven Adams (9)
| Bane, Jones (7)
| Toyota Center18,055
| 49–23
|-
|-style="background:#cfc;"
| 73
| March 23
| Brooklyn
| 
| Bane, Melton (23)
| Steven Adams (11) 
| Tyus Jones (10)
| FedEx Forum17,794
| 50–23
|-
|-style="background:#cfc;"
| 74
| March 24
| Indiana
| 
| Desmond Bane (30)
| Steven Adams (17)
| Steven Adams (6)
| FedEx Forum16,205
| 51–23
|-style="background:#cfc;"
| 75
| March 26
| Milwaukee
| 
| De'Anthony Melton (24)
| Adams, Tillman (11)
| Tyus Jones (10)
| FedEx Forum17,794
| 52–23
|-style="background:#cfc;"
| 76
| March 28
| Golden State
| 
| Desmond Bane (22)
| Adams, Tillman (9)
| Tyus Jones (6)
| FedEx Forum17,011
| 53–23
|-style="background:#cfc;"
| 77
| March 30
| @ San Antonio
| 
| Tyus Jones (25)
| Steven Adams (8)
| Tyus Jones (6)
| AT&T Center15,821
| 54–23
|-

|-style="background:#cfc;"
| 78
| April 1
| Phoenix
| 
| Dillon Brooks (30)
| Kyle Anderson (10)
| Brooks, Tillman (7) 
| FedEx Forum17,794
| 55–23
|-style="background:#fcc;"
| 79
| April 5
| @ Utah
|  
| Jaren Jackson Jr. (28)
| Steven Adams (13)
| Steven Adams (8)
| Vivint Arena18,306
| 55–24
|-style="background:#fcc;"
| 80
| April 7
| @ Denver
| 
| Desmond Bane (14)
| Steven Adams (8) 
| Adams, Konchar (5) 
| Ball Arena19,520
| 55–25
|-style="background:#cfc;"
| 81
| April 9
| New Orleans
|
| Dillon Brooks (23)
| Steven Adams (11)
| Ja Morant (9)
| FedEx Forum17,207
| 56–25
|-style="background:#fcc;"
| 82
| April 10
| Boston
| 
| Santi Aldama (20)
| John Konchar (13)
| John Konchar (10)
| FedEx Forum17,441
| 56–26

Playoffs

|- style="background:#fcc;"
| 1
| April 16
| Minnesota
| 
| Ja Morant (32)
| Brandon Clarke (12)
| Ja Morant (8)
| FedExForum17,794
| 0–1
|- style="background:#cfc;"
| 2
| April 19
| Minnesota
| 
| Ja Morant (23)
| Ja Morant (9)
| Ja Morant (10)
| FedExForum17,794
| 1–1
|- style="background:#cfc;"
| 3
| April 21
| @ Minnesota
| 
| Desmond Bane (26)
| Ja Morant (10)
| Ja Morant (10)
| Target Center19,634
| 2–1
|- style="background:#fcc;"
| 4
| April 23
| @ Minnesota
| 
| Desmond Bane (26)
| Ja Morant (10)
| Ja Morant (10)
| Target Center19,832
| 2–2
|- style="background:#cfc;"
| 5
| April 26
| Minnesota
| 
| Ja Morant (30)
| Brandon Clarke (15)
| Ja Morant (9)
| FedExForum17,794
| 3–2
|- style="background:#cfc;"
| 6
| April 29
| @ Minnesota
| 
| Desmond Bane (23)
| Jaren Jackson Jr. (14)
| Ja Morant (11)
| Target Center20,323
| 4–2

|- style="background:#fcc;"
| 1
| May 1
| Golden State
| 
| Ja Morant (34)
| Jaren Jackson Jr. (10)  
| Ja Morant (10)
| FedExForum17,794
| 01
|- style="background:#cfc;"
| 2
| May 3
| Golden State
| 
| Ja Morant (47)
| Ja Morant (8)
| Ja Morant (8)
| FedExForum17,794
| 11
|- style="background:#fcc;"
| 3
| May 7
| @ Golden State
| 
| Ja Morant (34)
| De'Anthony Melton (4)
| Ja Morant (7)
| Chase Center18,064
| 12
|- style="background:#fcc;"
| 4
| May 9
| @ Golden State
| 
| Jaren Jackson Jr. (21)
| Steven Adams (15)
| Dillon Brooks (8)
| Chase Center18,064
| 13
|- style="background:#cfc;"
| 5
| May 11
| Golden State
| 
| Jaren Jackson Jr. (21)
| Steven Adams (13)
| Tyus Jones (9)
| FedExForum17,794
| 23
|- style="background:#fcc;"
| 6
| May 13
| @ Golden State
|
| Dillon Brooks (30)
| Steven Adams (10)
| Tyus Jones (8)
| Chase Center18,064
| 24

Transactions

Subtractions

Notes

References

Memphis Grizzlies
Memphis Grizzlies seasons
Memphis Grizzlies
Memphis Grizzlies
Events in Memphis, Tennessee